Strange Cargo is a 1940 American romantic drama film directed by Frank Borzage and starring Clark Gable and Joan Crawford in a story about a group of fugitive prisoners from a French penal colony. The adapted screenplay by Lawrence Hazard was based upon the 1936 novel, Not Too Narrow, Not Too Deep, by Richard Sale.  The film was produced by Joseph L. Mankiewicz for Metro-Goldwyn-Mayer; it was the eighth and last film pairing of Crawford and Gable, and the first Gable picture released in the wake of Gone with the Wind. The supporting cast includes Ian Hunter and Peter Lorre.

Plot
Julie (Crawford), a cynical, world-weary cafe entertainer (and prostitute)  in a town near the Devil’s Island (French Guiana) penal colony, encounters André Verne (Clark Gable), a prisoner, on the wharf where he is hiding. He grabs her ankle and threatens her—she will be thrown off the island if she is found consorting with a prisoner.

André Verne's absence is not noticed because a man in a prisoner’s uniform (Ian Hunter) joins the returning work crew, making the count correct. Verne goes to Julie's room because he wants a woman. Julie wants none of him and threatens to turn him in, but she doesn’t get the chance because M'sieu Pig (Peter Lorre) has already reported him; he is found in Julie’s room and returned to prison. Julie is banished from the island and has no money for passage. The Pig wants her to stay, but she tells him nothing could ever make her so desperate that she would allow him to touch her. She goes to Marfeu (Bernard Nedell) for help and ends up a held prisoner in his shack.

Prison warden Grideau (Frederic Worlock) is mystified by the fact that the work gang count was correct even though Verne was outside the prison. Grideau thinks that Verne has potential, unlike most of the prisoners but fears the man is doomed. It is only a matter of time before he kills someone. In the prison barracks, the stranger, whose name is Cambreau, begins to show the qualities that begin to define him as a mysterious, supernatural character: his anticipation of events (including weather), his knowledge of people, his physical endurance, his readiness with appropriate quotes from scripture, even his unexplained possession of money when needed. In a conversation with Verne, he offers the idea, central to the film, that “every man has God in his heart.” Verne finds this wildly funny, pointing to all the wonderful examples of God around them.

Moll (Albert Dekker) has masterminded a jailbreak and takes Cambreau, Telez (Eduardo Ciannelli), Hessler (Paul Lukas), a serial killer who poisons his wives, Flaubert (J. Edward Bromberg), and Dufond (John Arledge) with him. Verne and Moll are bitter enemies, but in spite of this—or because of it—Verne plans to catch up with them and join in.

The trek through the jungle is brutal. They need food, and Cambreau, who never tires, strides off purposively into the undergrowth. Meanwhile Julie has been fighting with Marfeu, who caught her packing a sack with food, trying to get away. Her arm is raised to stab him to death when Cambreau’s voice is heard saying, “Not that way, Julie.”  When she goes to look there is no one, but the sack is gone and there is a wad of money, enough for a passage to the mainland. Marfeu takes it. Later, while Julie is begging him to let her go—hasn’t she been there long enough?—Verne bursts in. He takes the money from Marfeu and takes Julie with him. She makes it clear that she goes because he is the best thing available at the moment—She will ditch him if something better comes along. They understand each other perfectly. Soon after, Cambreau returns with the supplies.  Then Verne appears and joins the escapees.

When they reach the coast, they are all barely able to stand from thirst and exhaustion—except for  Cambreau. He stops Moll from drinking seawater, and somehow knows that the boat that has been hidden for them is around the next point. Refreshed by the water hidden there, they set sail for the mainland.

Then during a long, deadly, calm, Julie shares her ugly past, her new hopes, her love for Verne and her fears for him. She could gladly spend her life with him but not on the deadly path he is on. She wishes she could pray, and Cambreau gently tells her that she has been.

Only Verne, Julie, Hessler, and Cambreau survive the long ordeal.  The others die, some heroically, all receiving consolation from Cambreau. Once ashore, they set the boat adrift with Moll’s body in it, hoping the authorities  will assume that there were no survivors of the prison break.

Cambreau takes them to a fisherman’s hut where they take refuge, washing,  shaving, replacing their rags with clean clothes. The fisherman denies having a boat until Verne threatens him with a razor.

In the port on the mainland, Grideau and his men, accompanied by the Pig, examine the boat with Moll’s body in it. As the escapees hoped, they believe that all died, but the Pig finds a scrap of Julie’s dress and knows better.

Hessler leaves them, announcing that he is off to find a rich widow—his next victim. He is proud of having escaped Cambreau’s net and disdains Cambreau’s salvation, bidding him a mocking au revoir.  Cambreau  gravely replies that they will not meet again. Once outside, Hessler pauses and looks back, struggling against belief and then, grimacing demonically,  slinks off into the night as a storm begins.

Julie is on the waterfront, looking for passage on a ship in the harbor, but no one will row her out: The weather is bad and getting worse. The Pig sees her and threatens to expose Verne unless she agrees to go back to the island with him—and marry him. She scorns him at first, but realizing this is Verne’s only hope, she agrees, on condition that she be allowed to say goodbye, alone. Her conversation with Verne is agonizing, and when the Pig comes into the hut, Verne assumes the worst. In the end, Julie goes with the Pig. Cambreau is now the only person who knows that  Verne is alive, and  Verne will feel safer if he is dead. In spite of the terrible weather,  they row out to the boat with the fisherman. It is not until after they get there that Cambreau says he should stay behind; there are people he might help.  Verne decides to kill him, and punches him in the jaw, deliberately knocking him overboard into the crashing waves. Cambreau clings to a piece of driftwood, evoking the image of Christ on Calvary's cross.

The fisherman tells Verne that only he can save Cambreau, but Verne taunts the drowning man, demanding to know where God is now, saying “the fisherman is God! “ “I’m God! You’re... You’re....” but Cambreau goes under as he is shouting. Verne freezes in horror and then, desperately calling Cambreau’s name, dives into the raging sea to save him. Back on deck, Verne thinks Cambreau is dead and asks him why. Then Cambreau opens his eyes and Verne, weeping, embraces him.

It is bright day. The storm has cleared and Julie, the Pig and Grideau are on the deck of the steamer that will take them back to the island. Julie sees Verne walking confidently along the wharf toward the ship and runs out to stop him. He keeps on coming and, full of banter as usual, surrenders to Grideau.  Repentant but still cocky, he jokes that a woman like Julie was all the warden really needed to keep him in line. She will wait for him, and they will be married after he has served his term.

Across the harbor, aboard the fisherman’s boat, he and Cambreau watch the steamer. The fisherman asks if they will be all right eventually, and Cambreau replies that all is well now. He says “Goodbye, my friend,” to the fisherman, who removes his hat and replies, “Goodbye, Monsieur.” Cambreau grips the other man’s shoulder in farewell and strides off down the deck to disappear into the shadows where there is no passage. The gently smiling fisherman slowly makes the sign of the cross on his breast.

Cast
 Clark Gable as André Verne
 Joan Crawford as Julie
 Ian Hunter as Cambreau
 Peter Lorre as M'sieu Pig
 Paul Lukas as Hessler
 Albert Dekker as Moll
 J. Edward Bromberg as Flaubert
 Eduardo Ciannelli as Telez
 John Arledge as Dufond
 Frederick Worlock as Grideau (billed as Frederic Worlock)
 Bernard Nedell as Marfeu
 Victor Varconi as Fisherman
 Paul Fix as Benet

Reception
Film Daily said: "Here is a good, raw, stark melodrama which holds suspense from the start.  Frank Borzage has given it expert directorial attention...Clark Gable fits his role admirably...The acting is high-grade with Joan Crawford giving her best performance to date."

Variety commented: "Although the picture has its many deficiencies, the Crawford characterization will give studio execs idea of proper casting of her talents for the future.  Direction by Frank Borzage fails to hit the dramatic punches...He has not clearly defined the spiritual redemption angle, which also adds to the audience confusion.  The screenplay does not help Borzage out of his predicament."

Leonard Maltin describes Strange Cargo as an “Intriguing allegorical film...Not for all tastes, but there are fine, realistic performances and [a] flavorful Franz Waxman score.

Censorship issues plagued the film from the beginning, not only in terms of sex and violence but because of the mystical element. The  Catholic Legion of Decency gave it a "condemned" rating for presenting "a naturalistic concept of religion contrary to the teachings of Christ, irreverent use of Scripture, and lustful complications." The picture was banned in some places, and this had an adverse effect on the box office.

According to TCM.com, “A biography of producer Joseph L. Mankiewicz quotes him as saying: ‘It was almost a good film. I wish it could have been made later. It was tough doing any kind of film that even approached reality in any way.’ “

TCM’s Margarita Landazuri describes it as “a haunting and unusual film, controversial in its day, and considered by many critics to be the best expression of the metaphysical themes in the work of director Frank Borzage.”

Gross
According to MGM records the film earned $1,311,000 in the US and Canada and $603,000 elsewhere resulting in a profit of $21,000.

See also
 Clark Gable filmography
 Joan Crawford filmography

References

External links 
 
 
 
 
 

1940 films
1940s adventure drama films
American adventure drama films
American black-and-white films
Films scored by Franz Waxman
Films based on American novels
Films directed by Frank Borzage
Films set in jungles
Films set on Devil's Island
Metro-Goldwyn-Mayer films
Films produced by Frank Borzage
Films produced by Joseph L. Mankiewicz
American romantic drama films
1940 romantic drama films
1940s English-language films
Christ figures in fiction
Cultural depictions of Jesus
Portrayals of Jesus in film
1940s American films
Censored films
Religious controversies in film